Eskil Hagen (born 13 June 1970) is a Norwegian ice sledge hockey player. He won medals for Norway at the 1994 Winter Paralympics, 1998 Winter Paralympics, 2002 Winter Paralympics, 2006 Winter Paralympics and 2010 Winter Paralympics. He also played in the 2014 Winter Paralympics.

References

External links 
 

1970 births
Living people
Norwegian sledge hockey players
Paralympic sledge hockey players of Norway
Paralympic gold medalists for Norway
Paralympic silver medalists for Norway
Paralympic bronze medalists for Norway
Ice sledge hockey players at the 1994 Winter Paralympics
Ice sledge hockey players at the 1998 Winter Paralympics
Ice sledge hockey players at the 2002 Winter Paralympics
Ice sledge hockey players at the 2006 Winter Paralympics
Ice sledge hockey players at the 2010 Winter Paralympics
Ice sledge hockey players at the 2014 Winter Paralympics
Medalists at the 1994 Winter Paralympics
Medalists at the 1998 Winter Paralympics
Medalists at the 2002 Winter Paralympics
Medalists at the 2006 Winter Paralympics
Medalists at the 2010 Winter Paralympics
Paralympic medalists in sledge hockey
21st-century Norwegian people